The UNCAF U-16 Tournament is an association football competition contested by the under-16 national teams of the members of the Central American Football Union (UNCAF), the sport's Central American governing body.  The tournament is played every two years since 2006 and serves as a preparation competition for the CONCACAF Under-17 Championships.  Panama is the current champion.

Results

References

External links
 UNCAF Official website

 
U-16
Under-16 association football